The Tiga Dam is in Kano State in the Northwest of Nigeria, constructed in 1971–1974. It is a major reservoir on the Kano River, the main tributary of the Hadejia River.

Description

The dam was built during the administration of Governor Audu Bako in an attempt to improve food security through irrigation projects.
Water from the dam supplies the Kano River Irrigation Project as well as Kano City.

Downstream impact
Several studies have shown that the dam has delivered negative economic value when its effect on downstream communities was taken into account.
A study published in 1999 concluded that farmers in the downstream floodplain had adapted their agriculture, helped by new technology, but the increased level of production might not be sustainable.

The Hadejia-Nguru wetlands further downstream have considerable economic and ecological importance. They are home to about one million people living by wet-season rice farming, agriculture at other seasons, fishing and cattle grazing by Fulani people. The dam has damaged the cycle, reducing fish catches and harvests of other wetland products.

In August 2009, Senator Ahmed Ibrahim Lawan of Yobe North, Chairman of the Senate Committee on Public Accounts, stated that the Tiga Dam had reduced water flow in the Kano River by about 50%. The senator was speaking in opposition to the proposed Kafin Zaki Dam on the Jama'are River, the other main tributary of the Yobe River. He said the Tiga and Challawa Dams had caused intense poverty, increased desert encroachment, migration and conflicts between arable farmers and herdsmen. He noted that the Yobe River no longer flows into Lake Chad.

It is estimated that Lake Chad will dry up completely within 40 years. More than 30 million people derive their livelihood from the Lake Chad Basin through fishing, raising live stock and farming. A study group to examine the problem was established in November 2008, visiting the Tiga dam and other locations.

References

Dams in Nigeria
Kano State
Yobe State
Dams completed in 1974
20th-century architecture in Nigeria